Frise is a commune in the Somme department in Hauts-de-France in northern France.

Geography

Population

History
In the Middle Ages the village exploited the peat of the surrounding marshy lands. With so much fresh water, the fishing was, and still is very good in this aquatic environment.Frise was on the front line for much of the First World War, notably the Battle of the Somme in 1916. The outline of trenches and shell holes is still visible today.

See also
Communes of the Somme department

References

Communes of Somme (department)